Antonio Baratti (or Baratta; 7 January 1724, in Belluno (not in Florence as some sources say) – 28 July 1787, in Venice) was an Italian engraver, etcher and printmaker.

Baratti was educated in the workshop of Joseph Wagner in Venice, later together with Fabio Berardi and Francesco Bartolozzi.
Baratti studied and worked for a time at an engraver's workshop in Bassano del Grappa.
He married Valentina Monaco and opened his own workshop in which he was supported by his wife and his three sons Domenico, Tommaso (or Tomaso) and Pietro and soon also by the pupils Antonio Sandi and Giuseppe Daniotto.

He engraved single-sheet prints and prints as parts of larger publications. Among the motives are portraits and about 140 religious themed works, those after works by Paolo Veronese, Francesco Vanni, Guido Reni, Giovanni Battista Piazzetta and Pietro Antonio Novelli.

Baratti died on 28 July 1787 in Venice.

Some works 
 121 plates for the Italian edition Dizionario mitologico by André Declaustre, Venice: Domenico Ferrarin, 1755–1758, vol. 1 (1755), 2 (1755), 3 (1758)
 4 plates after works by Paolo Veronese, Francesco Vanni, Guido Reni and Onorio Marinari for the Raccolta di ottanta stampe rappresentanti i quadri più scelti dei SS. Marchesi Gerini di Firenze, Florence, 1786
 997 plates for the 33-volume Livorno edition of the Encyclopédie, 1770–1779
 portrait of Giambettino Cignaroli drawn by his nephew Saverio Dalla Rosa in the biography 

Works by his son Tommaso:
 5 plates for Orlando Furioso Di M. Lodovico Ariosto, Venice: Antonio Zatta, 1772

References 

People from Belluno
Italian engravers
1724 births
1787 deaths